Macrodactylini is a tribe of May beetles and junebugs in the family Scarabaeidae. There are at least 46 genera and over a thousand species described in the tribe Macrodactylini.

Genera
The following genera are recognised in the tribe Macrodactylini:

 Agaocnemis Moser, 1918 
 Alvarinus Blanchard, 1850 
 Ampliodactylus Smith, 2008 
 Ancistrosoma Curtis, 1835 
 Anomonyx Saylor, 1940 
 Astaenoplia Martínez, 1957  
 Barybas Blanchard, 1850  
 Byrasba Harold, 1869 
 Calodactylus Blanchard, 1850 
 Canestera Saylor, 1938  
 Ceraspis LePeletier de Saint-Fargeau & Audinet-Serville, 1828 
 Ceratolontha Arrow, 1948 
 Chariodactylus Moser, 1919  
 Chariodema Blanchard, 1850  
 Clavipalpus Laporte, 1832  
 Compsodactylus Fuhrmann, 2012  
 Dasyus LePeletier de Saint-Fargeau & Audinet-Serville, 1828 
 Dicrania LePeletier de Saint-Fargeau & Audinet-Serville, 1828 
 Euryaspis Blanchard, 1851 
 Extenuoptyophis Smith & Mondaca 2015  
 Faula Blanchard, 1850  
 Hamatoplectris Frey, 1967 
 Hieritis Burmeister, 1855  
 Isonychus Mannerheim, 1829
 Insimuloissacaris Smith & Mondaca, 2015  
 Issacaris Fairmaire, 1889 
 Junkia Dalla Torre, 1913 
 Macrodactylus Dejean, 1821 (rose chafers)
 Mallotarsus Blanchard, 1850  
 Manodactylus Moser, 1919  
 Manopus Conte de Castelnau, 1840 
 Modialis Fairmaire & Germain, 1860 
 Neuquenodactylus Smith & Mondaca, 2015 
 Oedichira Burmeister, 1855 
 Paulosawaya Martínez & d’Andretta, 1956 
 Pectinosoma Arrow, 1913 
 Philochloenia Dejean, 1833 
 Phytholaema Blanchard, 1851 
 Plectris LePeletier de Saint–Fargeau & Audinet–Serville, 1828 
 Pristerophora Harold, 1869 
 Pseudodicrania Gutiérrez, 1950  
 Pseudopectinosoma Katovich, 2011  
 Pseudoserica Guérin–Méneville, 1838 
 Ptyophis Redtenbacher, 1868 
 Rhinaspis Perty, 1833 
 Schizochelus Blanchard, 1850

References

Further reading

External links

 

Melolonthinae